Workaround is the first full-length solo release by British electronic artist Beatrice Dillon. Released on 7 February 2020 on the record label PAN, review aggregator Metacritic described the album's reception as "universal acclaim".

Reception

Accolades

Track listing

References 

2020 albums
Electronic albums by British artists